Aloe inermis is a small, stemless Aloe native to Yemen.

See also
Succulent plant

References

 Pictures of Aloe inermis

inermis
Endemic flora of Yemen